The Arboretum du Grenouillet is an arboretum located within the Parc National des Cévennes, in Gorniès, Hérault, Languedoc-Roussillon, France. It is open daily without charge.

The arboretum was created in 1905 by Charles Flahault (1852–1935), and contains species including Abies numidica, Acer campestris, Alnus glutinosa, Fraxinus ornus, Ginkgo biloba, Larix spp., Maclura pomifera, Populus tremulus, Sequoiadendron, Taxus baccata, and Toxylon pomiferum.

See also 
 List of botanical gardens in France

References 
 CPN2007 description (French), with photographs
 Rando Accueil description (French)
 Languedoc-Roussillon listing (French)

Grenouillet, Arboretum du
Grenouillet, Arboretum du